Signal Hill also called "Hio Hill" is a mountain in Barnstable County, Massachusetts. Bournedale Hills are located south of Signal Hill.

References

Mountains of Massachusetts
Mountains of Barnstable County, Massachusetts